= Samaro Road railway station =

Railway station in Pakistan

General information
- Coordinates: 25°18′03″N 69°27′28″E
- Owner: Ministry of Railways

Other information
- Station code: SAMR

History
- Former names: Great Indian Peninsula Railway
Location

Samaro Road (Tibohi Jo seher) (Urdu: سمارو روڈ ریلوے اسٹیشن) is located in Pakistan.

== See also ==
- List of railway stations in Pakistan
- Pakistan Railways
